The Solomon Islands Hockey Association is the governing body of field hockey in Solomon Islands, Oceania. Its headquarters are in Honiara, Solomon Islands. It is affiliated to IHF International Hockey Federation and OCF Oceania Hockey Federation.

Nihal Seneviratne is the President of Solomon Islands Hockey Association and Mr Joe Vasuni is the General Secretary.

History

Hockey Solomons visited Fiji for the first time in 37 years, when their men's and women's teams visited Fiji in June-July, 2016. The women's team will be visiting Malaysia in January, 2017 and Bangladesh in May 2017.

See also
Oceania Hockey Federation

References

External links
 Solomon Islands Hockey - FIH
 [Www.solomonislandshockey.com Solomon Islands Hockey web page]

National members of the Oceania Hockey Federation
Sport in the Solomon Islands